Linda Marie Wells (born December 13, 1949) is a former American softball coach. She previously served as the head coach for the Minnesota Golden Gophers softball and Arizona State Sun Devils softball teams.

Playing career
Wells was a three-sport athlete in high school, and played softball, volleyball, basketball, tennis and field hockey while at Southeast Missouri State University. She Played professionally from 1975 to 1979, serving as player-coach for the Chicago Ravens and St. Louis Hummers.

Coaching career

Minnesota
Wells started the Minnesota Golden Gophers softball program in 1974. She served as the head coach for the Gophers from 1974 to 1989, missing the 1976 season due to attending medical school at Saint Louis University. She was named the Big Ten Conference Softball Coach of the Year in 1988 after leading her team to a 31–25 record and the Big Ten Conference Championship. During her career at Minnesota she posted a 350–264–1 record.

She served as the Minnesota Golden Gophers women's basketball coach for the 1973–74 season, and an assistant coach from 1974 to 1977. She also served as the Minnesota Golden Gophers women's volleyball coach in 1974, and from 1977 to 1981. Her 1978 volleyball squad won an unofficial Big Ten title and her 1981 squad placed seventh at the AIAW National Championships.

Arizona State
Wells served as the head coach at Arizona State from 1990 to 2005, where she posted a 563–415 record and led the team to 12 NCAA Regional appearances and two Women's College World Series appearances. On February 13, 2005, Wells earned her 537th career win at Arizona State, surpassing Mary Littlewood for the most wins in program history. On March 5, 2005, Wells earned her 900th career win. Her 563 wins are the most in Arizona State softball history.

International career
Internationally she served as head coach of the United States women's national softball team that won a gold medal at the 1985 South Pacific Classic in Melbourne, Australia, and the 1987 Pan American Games gold-medal team. She also served as the head coach of Greece women's national softball team at the 2004 Summer Olympics in Athens, Greece and a coach for the Netherlands women's national softball team at the 2008 Summer Olympics in Beijing, China.

Legacy
Described as a women's sports pioneer, Wells has been inducted into several hall of fame, including the National Fastpitch Coaches Association Hall of Fame, Arizona Softball Hall of Fame, St. Louis Sports Hall of Fame, Southeast Missouri's Hall of Fame, the University of Minnesota Hall of Fame in volleyball and softball, and the State of Minnesota Hall of Fame.

Head coaching record

References

1949 births
Living people
American softball coaches
Arizona State Sun Devils softball coaches
Female sports coaches
Minnesota Golden Gophers softball coaches
Minnesota Golden Gophers women's basketball coaches
Minnesota Golden Gophers women's volleyball coaches
American volleyball coaches